Coleophora viettella is a moth of the family Coleophoridae. It is found in Saudi Arabia, the United Arab Emirates and Tunisia.

References

viettella
Moths described in 1956
Moths of Asia
Moths of Africa